Sandy Wilson may refer to:

Sir Andrew Wilson (RAF officer)
Sir Colin St John Wilson (1922–2007), British architect, lecturer, and author
Sandy Wilson (director) (born 1947), Canadian film director
Sandy Wilson (1924–2014), English composer and lyricist.
Sandy Fife Wilson (born 1950), Native American art educator, fashion designer and artist

See also
Alexander Wilson (disambiguation)